The Essential Shawn Mullins is a compilation album by American rock singer-songwriter Shawn Mullins which includes remastered songs mostly from his 2 previous folk-rock albums, Soul's Core and Beneath the Velvet Sun.  The album was released on 1 April 2003 by Sony.

Track listing
 "Lullaby" (Mullins) - 5:30
 "Lately" (ft. Michael Ward)(Mullins) - 4:26
 "This Time/Last Time" (Mullins) - 2:59
 "Canyons and Caverns" (Mullins) - 4:19
 "The Gulf of Mexico" (Mullins) - 3:44
 "Anchored in You" (Mullins) - 3:19
 "Shimmer" (Mullins) - 4:08
 "Everywhere I Go" (Mullins) - 3:51
 "Somethin' To Believe In" (ft. Shawn Colvin) (Mullins) - 3:43
 "Santa Fe" (Mullins) - 3:49
 "I Know" (ft. Shelby Lynne)(Mullins) - 4:00
 "Joy Terrell Brown" (Mullins) - 2:45
 "Lonesome, I Know You Too Well" (Mullins) - 3:10
 "Border Song (Holy Moses)" (John/Taupin) - 3:22
 "Lullaby" (Mullins) - 5:05

References

Shawn Mullins albums
2003 greatest hits albums